Adam Ozeri (born March 7, 1998) is an American professional soccer player who plays as an attacking midfielder for Patriotas Boyacá of the Colombian Categoría Primera A.

Club career
Ozeri started his youth career in his homeland with Manhattan Kickers, before switching to TSF Academy soon after. Ozeri would eventually head to Spain with Cornellà, notably finishing as top goalscorer in 2014 for the U15s of the Catalonia-based club. After leaving Cornellà, Ozeri headed to Argentina with Racing Club. After time in their youth, he moved over to Banfield's system. In mid-2016, Ozeri was signed by Peru's Alianza Lima; though would see no senior action. In 2017, Ozeri sealed a return to Argentina with Ferro Carril Oeste. February 2019 saw Ozeri depart on loan to Brazilian Série D outfit Boavista.

After featuring four times, including twice against Gaúcho, for Boavista, Ozeri went back to Ferro Carril Oeste ahead of the 2019–20 campaign in Primera B Nacional. His first appearance subsequently arrived, as he played the full duration of a 2–1 defeat away to Estudiantes on September 13. In 2020, Ozeri joined Orlando City B on loan, making 12 appearances for the team in USL League One.

In February 2021, Ozeri joined Patriotas.

International career
2014 saw Ozeri participate in training camps with both Israel and the United States at youth level. In August 2016, Ozeri was called up to the latter's U19s by Brad Friedel for the subsequent month's Stevan Vilotic Tournament in Subotica, Serbia. He also made Friedel's squad for a training camp in the succeeding November.

Career statistics
.

References

External links

1998 births
Living people
Soccer players from New York City
American soccer players
Association football midfielders
American expatriate soccer players
American people of Israeli descent
UE Cornellà players
Racing Club de Avellaneda footballers
Club Atlético Banfield footballers
Club Alianza Lima footballers
Ferro Carril Oeste footballers
Boavista Sport Club players
Orlando City B players
Patriotas Boyacá footballers
Campeonato Brasileiro Série D players
Primera Nacional players
USL League One players
Categoría Primera A players
Expatriate footballers in Spain
Expatriate footballers in Argentina
Expatriate footballers in Peru
Expatriate footballers in Brazil
Expatriate footballers in Colombia
American expatriate sportspeople in Spain
American expatriate sportspeople in Argentina
American expatriate sportspeople in Peru
American expatriate sportspeople in Brazil
American expatriate sportspeople in Colombia